Benhar is a small town and commune in Djelfa Province, Algeria. According to the 1998 census it has a population of 10,380 and it has the biggest surface in Djelfa .

References

Communes of Djelfa Province